Master of the Bargello Tondo (1400 – 1450), was an Italian painter.

Biography
He was a painter of religious works who is known by a tondo in the possession of the Bargello.

He worked in Florence.

References

Master of the Bargello Tondo on Artnet

1400 births
1450 deaths
15th-century Italian painters
Painters from Florence